Demexiptiline (brand names Deparon, Tinoran) is a tricyclic antidepressant (TCA) used in France for the treatment of depression. It acts primarily as a norepinephrine reuptake inhibitor similarly to desipramine.

Synthesis
The synthesis is similar to that reported for Noxiptiline but also differs in a couple of respects.

The condensation between Dibenzosuberenone [2222-33-5] (1) and hydroxylamine (2) gives the oxime, [1021-91-6] (3). Base catalyzed attachment of the sidechain by reaction with 2-Chloro-N-Methylethanamine [32315-92-7] (4) completed the synthesis of demexiptiline (5).

References

Further reading
 

Dibenzocycloheptenes
Ketoximes
Tricyclic antidepressants